Wellington College Belfast (better known as Wellington College or WCB) is a co-educational, grammar school located in Belfast, Northern Ireland. The most recent principal is David Castles. The school was formed when, in 1989, the all-boys' Annadale Grammar School and the all-girls' Carolan Grammar School merged to become a single

History
Wellington College was founded in 1989 after Annadale Boys and Carolan Girls merged. The school is named after Arthur Wellesley, 1st Duke of Wellington. The school moved to its current location on Carolan Road in 2002, which included 2 new rugby pitches, a gravel pitch, an astro pitch and a running track.

In 2002 the new school buildings were officially opened by Prince Andrew who met staff and pupils and had lunch with the Head Girls and Boys.

Principals

Uniform
The Wellington blazer takes its blue colour from that of the British Army during the 19th century which was the uniform worn by the Duke of Wellington during his service. The sports kit for Wellington was changed in May 2011.

Extracurricular activities
Wellington offers a number of extracurricular activities to its pupils. These normally run after school or during lunch time, and are generally overseen by members of the teaching or library staff. In some cases a specialist in a particular subject may be invited to take a course (e.g. In January 2008 Neil Best and Rob Dewey helped with rugby training)
Activities include;
Scripture Union
Science Club
Art Club
Concert Band
Boy's Choir
Junior Choir
Senior Choir
Junior Brass Group
Senior Brass Group
Woodwind Group
String Trio
School Council
Senior Chess Club
Senior Photography Club
Snail Racing
Bear Baiting

Awards
 2005 International School Award
 The school KLQ team won the Kids' Lit Quiz in 2007 at the world final in Oxford.
Wellington received an award for raising money and providing donations of items to Haiti after the earthquake.
In 2012, three pupils in Year 11 won the Northern Irish Regional heat of the WorldWise Geography quiz and then became runners up the next year. The team consisted of Jack Taylor (captain), Adam Callender and Marc Thompson.

Future Chef 2011
Christopher Marshall, (a then year 10 pupil) represented Wellington in the Northern Ireland Future Chef competition 2011. He won the Northern Ireland competition on Wednesday 2 February 2011. He was then entered into the Future Chef Final and travelled to London on 21 March 2011 for the competition, getting the chance to meet Ainsley Harriott and Brian Turner.

Mathematical Olympiad 2011
Dale Walmsley, (a then year 12 student at Wellington) was awarded a gold medal and a book prize in the UK Intermediate Mathematical Olympiad. Dale was the only student from Northern Ireland to achieve a gold medal and book prize in the Olympiad. This accolade means that he is ranked within the top 50 mathematicians of his age in the UK. Mr Cantley, head of the Mathematics department at Wellington at that time, stated that everyone at the College is absolutely delighted by Dale’s achievement. Mr Cantley, who taught Dale since third year, stated that Dale is a truly remarkable young mathematician, having obtained an A* in GCSE Mathematics at only 14, an A* in both GCSE Additional Mathematics and A Level Mathematics at 15 and first place in the 2010 Northern Ireland GCSE Additional Mathematics examination.

Notable former pupils

References

External links
 Official website

 
Grammar schools in Belfast
Kids' Lit Quiz winners
Education in Belfast
Secondary schools in Belfast
Educational institutions established in 1990
1990 establishments in Northern Ireland